Anthology 3 is a compilation album by the Beatles, released on 29 October 1996 by Apple Records as part of The Beatles Anthology series. The album includes rarities and alternative tracks from the final three years of the band's career, ranging from the initial sessions for The Beatles (better known as "the White Album") to the last sessions for Let It Be and Abbey Road in 1969 and early 1970. It is the last in a trilogy of albums with Anthology 1 and Anthology 2, all of which tie in with the televised special The Beatles Anthology.

The album was certified 3× Platinum by the RIAA and was the group's third double album in a row to reach number one on the US charts, equalling a record set by Donna Summer in the 1970s.

The Anthology albums were remastered and made available digitally on the iTunes Store on 14 June 2011, individually and as part of the Anthology Box Set.

Content
Following "Free as a Bird" on Anthology 1 and "Real Love" on Anthology 2, a third John Lennon solo demo entitled "Now and Then" was to be reworked by the three surviving members of The Beatles (George Harrison, Paul McCartney and Ringo Starr) for Anthology 3. However, this project was shelved due to Harrison's dislike of the song. McCartney later stated that Harrison called Lennon's demo recording "fucking rubbish". McCartney told Q Magazine in 1997 that "George didn't like it. The Beatles being a democracy, we didn't do it." In its place is "A Beginning", an orchestral instrumental track by the band's producer George Martin, initially intended for the White Album as the intro to "Don't Pass Me By".

Connecting to the previous Anthology albums, the cover image painted by Klaus Voormann features a collage of Beatles-related imagery designed to appear as a wall of peeling posters and album covers. An updated picture of Voormann can be seen in Harrison's hair in a segment of the Revolver album cover.

Track listing

CD release
All tracks in stereo, except where noted.

Vinyl release

Side one:
"A Beginning"
"Happiness Is a Warm Gun"
"Helter Skelter"
"Mean Mr. Mustard"
"Polythene Pam"
"Glass Onion"
"Junk"
"Piggies"
"Honey Pie"
"Don't Pass Me By"
"Ob-La-Di, Ob-La-Da"
"Good Night"

Side two
"Cry Baby Cry"
"Blackbird"
"Sexy Sadie"
"While My Guitar Gently Weeps"
"Hey Jude"
"Not Guilty"
"Mother Nature's Son"

Side three
"Glass Onion"
"Rocky Raccoon"
"What's the New Mary Jane"
"Step Inside Love" / "Los Paranoias"
"I'm So Tired"
"I Will"
"Why Don't We Do It in the Road?"
"Julia"

Side four
"I've Got a Feeling"
"She Came in Through the Bathroom Window"
"Dig a Pony"
"Two of Us"
"For You Blue"
"Teddy Boy"
Medley: "Rip It Up" / "Shake, Rattle and Roll" / "Blue Suede Shoes"

Side five
"The Long and Winding Road"
"Oh! Darling"
"All Things Must Pass"
"Mailman, Bring Me No More Blues"
"Get Back"
"Old Brown Shoe"
"Octopus's Garden"
"Maxwell's Silver Hammer"

Side six
"Something"
"Come Together"
"Come and Get It"
"Ain't She Sweet"
"Because"
"Let It Be"
"I Me Mine"
"The End"

Cassette release

Side one
"A Beginning"
"Happiness Is a Warm Gun"
"Helter Skelter"
"Mean Mr. Mustard"
"Polythene Pam"
"Glass Onion"
"Junk"
"Piggies"
"Honey Pie"
"Don't Pass Me By"
"Ob-La-Di, Ob-La-Da"
"Good Night"
"Cry Baby Cry"
"Blackbird"
"Sexy Sadie"
"While My Guitar Gently Weeps"

Side two
"Hey Jude"
"Not Guilty"
"Mother Nature's Son"
"Glass Onion"
"Rocky Raccoon"
"What's the New Mary Jane"
"Step Inside Love" / "Los Paranoias"
"I'm So Tired"
"I Will"
"Why Don't We Do It in the Road?"
"Julia"

Side three
"I've Got a Feeling"
"She Came in Through the Bathroom Window"
"Dig a Pony"
"Two of Us"
"For You Blue"
"Teddy Boy"
Medley: "Rip It Up" / "Shake, Rattle and Roll" / "Blue Suede Shoes"
"The Long and Winding Road"
"Oh! Darling"
"All Things Must Pass"
"Mailman, Bring Me No More Blues"

Side four
"Get Back"
"Old Brown Shoe"
"Octopus's Garden"
"Maxwell's Silver Hammer"
"Something"
"Come Together"
"Come and Get It"
"Ain't She Sweet"
"Because"
"Let It Be"
"I Me Mine"
"The End"

Charts

Weekly charts

Year-end charts

Certifications

References

1996 compilation albums
Albums arranged by George Martin
Albums produced by George Martin
Albums recorded at Apple Studios
Albums recorded in a home studio
Albums with cover art by Klaus Voormann
Apple Records compilation albums
Capitol Records compilation albums
Compilation albums published posthumously
The Beatles Anthology
The Beatles compilation albums